The Rt Hon Katy Clark MSP (born 3 July 1967) is a British politician and life peer who has served as a Member of the Scottish Parliament (MSP) for the West Scotland region since 2021. A member of the Labour Party, she was Member of Parliament (MP) for North Ayrshire and Arran from 2005 to 2015.

Early life and career
Clark was born in Kilwinning, and went to Ayr Grammar Primary School then Kyle Academy, both in Ayr, before attending the University of Aberdeen, receiving an LLB in 1990. She was Chair of Aberdeen University Labour Club, NUS (Scotland) Women's Officer and active in women's campaigns, anti-poll tax campaigning, and the campaign against the Gulf and then Iraq War. She received a Diploma in Legal Practice from the University of Edinburgh in 1991. She qualified as a solicitor in England, Scotland and Wales specialising in civil litigation, criminal defence work and employment law. She was active in MSF trade union and Edinburgh and District Trades Council in the 1990s before joining TGWU in 1998.

She was a solicitor in private practice in Edinburgh and Musselburgh from 1991 to 1998, an Executive Member of the Scottish Council for Civil Liberties, and a legal officer, then Head of Membership Legal Services with UNISON nationally from 1998 to 2005. Whilst at the latter organisation, she undertook employment litigation, including Europe's biggest equal pay case, in which she won £35m in back pay for female nurses and other medical staff in the North West of England who had been unlawfully underpaid compared with their male colleagues.

She joined the Labour Party at the age of seventeen and is a member of the Unite, GMB and UNISON trade unions. Her great-great grandfather, Alexander Sloan, was Labour (ILP) MP for South Ayrshire from 1939 until his death in 1946.

House of Commons: 2005–2015 
Clark unsuccessfully contested the parliamentary seat of Galloway and Upper Nithsdale at the 1997 general election, a traditional Conservative and Scottish National Party (SNP) marginal. She finished in third place behind the Secretary of State for Trade and Industry Ian Lang, who lost his seat to the SNP's Alasdair Morgan.

She was elected to the House of Commons at the 2005 general election for the new seat of North Ayrshire and Arran, based substantially on the former seat of Cunninghame North, whose MP Brian Wilson had retired, and the towns of Stevenston and Kilwinning from the old Cunninghame South. She had a majority of 11,296, and made her maiden speech on 7 June 2005. She was nominated for House magazine's 'Maiden Speech of the Year'. Following the election, The Guardian named her as one of eight new MPs "to watch".

Campaigns

Socialism and anti-austerity 
One of the few left-wing members of Labour's 2005 intake of MPs, she was a member of the Socialist Campaign Group and a founder member of the Scottish Labour Party Campaign for Socialism. Of the twenty-four members of the Campaign Group, she was the only one under the age of 50.

In 2010, Clark was one of only seven MPs to vote for left-winger Diane Abbott in the 2010 Labour Leadership Election.

Clark established a reputation as a rebel within the Parliamentary Labour Party, voting against ID cards. However, she did not consider herself to be a rebel, stating that her "views are consistent with Labour's traditions". She was one of 16 signatories of an open letter to party leader Ed Miliband in January 2015, calling on the party to commit to oppose further austerity, take rail franchises back into public ownership and strengthen collective bargaining arrangements.

Human rights and internationalism 

Clark campaigned on human rights issues, and was one of 95 Labour MPs who opposed replacing Britain's Trident nuclear weapons system. She supported a 'No' vote in the 2011 AV Referendum.

Clark supported the call for the recognition of the state of Palestine. She was amongst a handful of MPs who opposed the bombing of Libya, and was a member of the Committees on Arms Export Controls, regularly calling for stricter limits on arms sales.

Clark is a Patron of the Greek Solidarity Campaign.

Refugee rights 
Clark campaigned to support European Union emergency plans to ensure safety for migrants crossing the Mediterranean.

LGBT rights 
Throughout her time as an MP, Clark consistently voted in favour of increased rights for LGBT+ people, including voting in favour of same-sex marriage in 2013.

Constituency campaigns 
On local issues, she campaigned against the contracting out of Calmac lifeline ferry services, with her first Parliamentary Question being about the tendering of services; for compensation of the victims of the Farepak Christmas savings scheme;  against the privatisation of DM Beith; against the closure of Coastguard Stations and job centres; and for the retraining of former workers employed at the closed Simclar factory.

Trade union campaigns 
She was Secretary of the Trade Union Group of Labour MPs and Chair of the CWU Group of MPs, taking up many trade union, equalities, human rights, consumer and employment rights issues in Parliament. She was also a member of the GMB, UNISON, FBU, Bakers Union, NUJ, UNITE, PCS, RMT, ASLEF and TSSA Parliamentary Groups.

Royal Mail privatisation 
As a member of the Business, Innovation and Skills Committee, Clark held UBS and Goldman Sachs bankers to account, questioning them over their valuation of the Royal Mail during its privatisation.

Scottish Deputy Leadership Campaign 2014
Clark was not elected when she stood as a left candidate to be Deputy Leader of the Scottish Labour Party in 2014, arguing for a change in direction. She lost her Commons seat of North Ayrshire and Arran at the May 2015 general election to the SNP candidate Patricia Gibson.

Leadership of Jeremy Corbyn: 2015–2020 
Clark was an early supporter of Jeremy Corbyn's 2015 leadership campaign. a key strategist on the campaign and was appointed as his Political Secretary in November 2015, following his election as leader.

In 2017, Corbyn tasked Clark with leading a review into the democratic functioning of the Labour Party at every level, including Labour Leadership Elections, the makeup of the National Executive Committee, giving Labour members greater say in party policy, building Constituency Labour Parties, local and regional Government and improving the situation of women, LGBT+, BAME, disabled and young members.

Announcing the review in a message to Labour Members, Clark said:We want our members to be at the heart of our party – to have more power – over policy, how we campaign, organise and run our party, just as we want the people of Britain to be at the heart of deciding how our communities, economy and society are organised. That is what the democracy review is about.The Democracy Review reported in September 2018, and rule changes to increase party democracy were adopted. Clark has suggested that she would like these reforms to go further and that some of her proposed reforms were watered down.

Clark was proposed as a candidate to stand in Rochdale prior to the 2017 general election, having previously withdrawn from consideration for election to the Leigh constituency because of accusations by local members of her being a parachute candidate. Clark was not elected when she stood as a Labour candidate on the London list at the 2019 European Parliament election. Later in 2019, she was shortlisted along with local councillors Ibrahim Dogus and Florence Eshalomi for the South London seat of Vauxhall at that year's general election, securing a personal endorsement from John McDonnell as well as the left-wing campaign group Momentum. Clark finished in second place losing out to Eshalomi.

House of Lords and Scottish Parliament: 2020–present 
Clark was created Baroness Clark of Kilwinning, of Kilwinning in the County of Ayrshire, on 3 September 2020, under which name she is a member of the House of Lords as a Labour peer. Baroness Clark made her maiden speech on 28 September 2020.

Clark was elected as a member of the Scottish Parliament for the West Scotland region for the Scottish Labour Party, having also stood as its candidate for the Cunninghame North constituency at the 2021 Scottish Parliament election. Prior to her election, Clark previously expressed her intent to 'stand down' from the House of Lords if elected to Holyrood. She took a leave of absence in May 2021, due to being elected to the Scottish Parliament. She was appointed as Shadow Minister for Community Safety in the Scottish Labour shadow cabinet in May 2021.

Views 
Clark is a socialist and was regarded as on the left of the Parliamentary party when she was an MP. She was opposed to Prime Minister Boris Johnson's Brexit plan, has called for a second referendum and was committed to campaigning for "remain" if such a vote were to take place.

Personal life 
Clark has lived in Scotland and Vauxhall, having moved to London in 1998, and has a daughter.

Notes

References

External links
 Official website
 
 
 Biography – Katy Clark MP Scottish Labour (Archived)
Katy Clark MP The Guardian
 Video clip: Katy Clark MP – People's Assembly 20th March 2007 YouTube, 22 March 2007

1967 births
Living people
Labour Party (UK) life peers
Scottish Labour MPs
UK MPs 2005–2010
UK MPs 2010–2015
Scottish republicans
Scottish socialists
Scottish solicitors
Scottish trade unionists
People educated at Kyle Academy
Alumni of the University of Aberdeen
Alumni of the University of Edinburgh
People from Kilwinning
Female members of the Parliament of the United Kingdom for Scottish constituencies
Female members of the Scottish Parliament
Labour MSPs
Members of the Scottish Parliament 2021–2026
Life peeresses created by Elizabeth II